Edemissen is a municipality in the district of Peine, in Lower Saxony, Germany. It is situated approximately 7 km north of Peine, and 25 km northwest of Braunschweig.

Municipal subdivisions

Personalities 

 Adolf-Friedrich Kuntzen (1889-1964), officer, most recently General of the Panzertruppe in the Second World War
 Hans Nowak (1922-1996), artist painter
 Ernst Schacht (1953-2008), theologian, Evangelical Lutheran bishop

References

Peine (district)